Mick Dennis (born 10 May 1952 in Isleworth, Middlesex, England) is a retired sports writer, broadcaster, editor and author.
In a career of more than 40 years in newspapers he wrote (mostly about football) for The Sun, The Sunday Times, The Daily Mirror, The Daily Telegraph, the London Evening Standard (where he held a number of executive positions, including sports editor) and The Daily Express, (where he was football correspondent from December 2003 until March 2015, when he retired from day-to-day journalism). During the first 15 years of the 2000s he appeared regularly on Sky News, had a weekly spot on Sky Sports News, was a guest presenter on Talksport radio and LBC radio and frequently contributed to programmes on BBC Radio 5 Live.
Born in Isleworth, Middlesex, the son of Lawrence, an airport worker, and Gladys, nee Hasler, he grew up in Hounslow and
attended Isleworth Grammar School (now Isleworth and Syon School)  before taking a National Council for the Training of Journalists  course at Harlow College and then training as a reporter on the Eastern Daily Press.
He was a magistrate from 2005 until 2022 and was an active football referee for more than 25 years. He worked as a volunteer in the communications department of the international aid charity Plan UK and was a trustee of Victim Support Hertfordshire. He still mentors young referees. He served on various funding panels for the Football Foundation as an independent member, including spells as chair of the Foundation's Social Fund and as the initial vice-chair of the Premier League & FA Facilities Fund. He was a trustee of Norwich City's Community Sports Foundation for nine years, during which that organisation raised funds for, and opened, a community sports and education hub: The Nest. He was a trustee and director of the Dacorum Sports Trust (which trades as Sportspace) from its formation in 2003 until May 2018 and was its chair for five years, during which the Trust built an extreme sports facility. On resigning from Sportspace's board of trustees he was appointed an honorary patron. He was a founder member of Kick it Out's grassroots advisory group. He collaborated with referee Graham Poll on the latter's autobiography, "Seeing Red", and "Geoff Hurst, The Hand of God and the Biggest Rows in Football." He has written a book about football, The Team, which is part of the Quick Reads Initiative series of books, aimed at readers who lack confidence, and has contributed to four anthologies of sports writing. After retiring from newspaper and broadcast journalism in 2015 he edited three volumes of Norwich City essays called Tales From The city. He was one of the original contributors to the Norwich City blogsite My Football Writer and continues to write occasional columns for that site.
He lives in Hemel Hempstead, Hertfordshire, and has been married for more than 45 years. He and his wife, Sarah, a former journalist and charity worker, have two married sons and six grandchildren.

References

Living people
British male journalists
1952 births